This is a list of episodes for the TV show The Super Hero Squad Show.

In the opening sequence of the first season, the Hulk picks up an Infinity Fractal, and is transformed by its power into something different every episode. This feature was later removed for the second season. Additionally, each episode's title card is an homage to a classic comic book cover as are some of the episode titles.

Series overview
{| class="wikitable"
|-
! colspan="2" |Season
! Episodes
! First aired
! Last aired
|-   
| style="background:#80c9ff; color:#100; text-align:center;"|    
| style="text-align:center;"| [[List of The Super Hero Squad Show episodes#Season 1: 2009–10|1]]
| style="text-align:center;"| 26   
| style="text-align:center;"| September 14, 2009   
| style="text-align:center;"| February 20, 2010
|-
| style="background:#bc8f8f; color:#100; text-align:center;"|    
| style="text-align:center;"| [[List of The Super Hero Squad Show episodes#Season 2: 2010–11|2]]
| style="text-align:center;"| 26
| style="text-align:center;"| October 23, 2010
| style="text-align:center;"| October 14, 2011
|}

Episodes

Season 1: 2009–10

Season 2: 2010–11

References

Super Hero Squad Show
Suoer Hero Squad
Super Hero Squad Show